Qillqa (Quechua for writing (the act and art of writing)  Hispanicized spelling Quilca) is a mountain in the Andes of Peru, about  high. It is located in the Puno Region, Melgar Province, Macari District, near the border with the Cusco Region, Espinar Province, Alto Pichigua District.

References

Mountains of Peru
Mountains of Puno Region